Inglis Drever (18 March 1999 – October 2009) was a champion racehorse trained in the North of England by Howard Johnson. He was one of the most successful hurdle racing horses to date and won the World Hurdle three times, bettered only by the former champion Big Buck's. He is seen by many as having been the greatest staying hurdler of all time.

Racing career

Flat racing
His career started as a Flat horse, where he was trained by Sir Mark Prescott and won 4 of his 12 starts under Flat rules.

National Hunt racing
It was over hurdles, however, that Inglis Drever excelled, winning on his first run over hurdles in November 2003 at Aintree.

Victory in the 'Fighting Fifth Hurdle' at Newcastle had many believing that the Champion Hurdle was a serious prospect for the horse. Inglis Drever won the first-ever running of the '2005 Ladbroke World Hurdle'. After suffering a career-threatening injury with a fall at Newbury, he was unable to defend his title 2006. (My Way De Solzen)

He did, however, return to the track and reclaimed 'The World Hurdle' crown in both 2007 and 2008. In 2008, he was the oldest horse at the time to win The World/Stayers Hurdle. He was ridden by three different jockeys on all three of his Cheltenham Festival wins.

Pedigree

Retirement and death
Inglis Drever picked up a leg injury in the 'Long Distance Hurdle' at Newbury in November 2008. His trainer, Howard Johnson, had reported him to be recovering well. However, in January 2009, Inglis Drever was retired as a result of this injury.

He was euthanised after suffering a bout of colic on 16 October 2009.

References

1999 racehorse births
2009 racehorse deaths
Cheltenham Festival winners
Thoroughbred family 2-n
National Hunt racehorses
Racehorses bred in the United Kingdom
Racehorses trained in the United Kingdom